Santiago Martín Rivas was a major in the Peruvian Army, a member of the Army Intelligence Service, and the leader of a death squad known as Grupo Colina, responsible for a number of massacres during the government of Alberto Fujimori. He is currently imprisoned.

References

Peruvian Army officers
Peruvian criminals
Peruvian prisoners and detainees
Prisoners and detainees of Peru
Living people
Year of birth missing (living people)